Kochi is a city in Kerala, India.

Kochi or Kōchi may also refer to:

People
 Kochi people, a predominantly Pashtun nomadic people of Afghanistan
 , a Japanese surname:
 Arata Kochi (born 1948 or 1949), Japanese physician and World Health Organization official
 Jun Kochi (born 1983), Japanese football goalkeeper in the Dhivehi Premier League, Maldives
 , a Japanese surname with a different pronunciation:
 Kōchi Chōjō (1843–1891), aristocrat of the Ryukyu Kingdom
 Kōchi Ryōtoku (died 1798), bureaucrat of the Ryukyu Kingdom
 Jay Kochi (1927–2008), American organic chemist of Japanese descent
 Momoko Kochi (1932–1998), Japanese actress
 Mizuho Katayama (previously Mizuho Kōchi; born 1969), synchronized swimming coach in Japan 
 Erica Kochi (born 1979), UNICEF official
 Kairi Kochi (born 1985), Japanese handball player
 Yugo Kochi (born 1994), Japanese singer
 A given name:
 Kochi Rani Mondal, Bangladeshi Kabaddi player

Places
 Kochi, a city in the state of Kerala, India, also known as Cochin
 Fort Kochi, one of the three main urban components which constitute the present day city of Kochi, Kerala, India
 Kochi International Book Festival, an annual event conducted at the coastal city of Kochi, Kerala, India
 Kochi metropolitan area, also known as Kochi Urban Agglomeration or Kochi UA, where the city of Kochi, India is located
 Kochi, Iran, a village in Isfahan Province, Iran
 Kōchi, Hiroshima, a former town in Hiroshima Prefecture, Japan
 Kōchi (city), the capital city of Kōchi Prefecture, Japan
 Kōchi Castle, a castle located in Kōchi, Kōchi Prefecture, Japan
 Kōchi Prefecture, a prefecture in Japan
 Kōchi Ryōma Airport, also known as Kōchi Airport, a regional airport in Nankoku, Kōchi Prefecture, Japan
 Kochi Sub-county of Yumbe District, Uganda
 River Kochi at Kochi Sub-county of Yumbe, Uganda.

Business
 Kochi Metro Rail, a mass transit system for the southern India city of Kochi
 Kochi Refineries, a petroleum company in India
 Kochi Tuskers Kerala, a 2011 IPL cricket team, now defunct

Other
 2396 Kochi,  an asteroid discovered in 1981
 Kochi font, a font development project by Yasuyuki Furukawa to build free replacements of proprietary fonts
 Kochi reaction, an organic reaction for the decarboxylation of carboxylic acids to alkyl halides
 Kochi (kuih), a Malay-style cake with coconut filling
 Kochi Fighting Dogs, a semi-professional baseball team in the Shikoku Island League of Japan

See also
 Kōchi Station (disambiguation)
 Kochi University (disambiguation)

Japanese-language surnames